Route Twisk is a steep and tortuous dual-lane road in Hong Kong, linking Tsuen Wan and Pat Heung via Shek Kong. It joins Kam Tin Road and Lam Kam Road north in Kam Tin, and ends in the Tsuen Kam Interchange south in Tsuen Wan.

It was named for the initials of the two places it links: Tsun Wan (ie Tsuen Wan) and Shek Kong. A further suggestion is that it was a misprint of the identification Route TW/SK in a construction project document.

It is the only link to Tai Mo Shan Road, the road leading to Tai Mo Shan, the highest peak in Hong Kong. The last section of Stage 8 of the MacLehose Trail runs along Tai Mo Shan Road. Opposite this intersection is a car park, and the starting point of Stage 9 of the trail, which continues in a westerly direction. Because the road is narrow and steep with many bends, vehicles longer than 10 metres are prohibited except for some buses that have obtained permits to run on the road.

History
In the late 1940s, Route Twisk was built for military use. In early 1960s, Hong Kong Government sought successfully to acquire the road from the British forces and opened it to the public on 25 May 1961.

The road ended in Castle Peak Road in Tsuen Wan originally. It was shortened to Tsuen Kam Interchange for the construction of MTR Tsuen Wan line.

Major intersections

See also
List of streets and roads in Hong Kong

References

External links

 CentaLink map of Route Twisk (incorrectly labelled Tsuen Kam Road; the correct English name is shown if the map is zoomed in)

Shek Kong
Tsuen Wan
Kam Tin
Extra areas operated by NT taxis
Roads in the New Territories